Harriet "Harry" Eastwood is a British-born chef and cookbook author living in Paris. She co-hosted the Channel 4 cooking-themed television series Cook Yourself Thin in 2007; She went on to present the US version of the show and co-wrote the accompanying cookbook, which later became The New York Times bestseller.

Harry has since written four more cookery books, Red Velvet & Chocolate Heartache – which has sold more than 42,000 copies, The Skinny French Kitchen – which was nominated for the prestigious Guild of Food Writers Miriam Poulnin Award for Healthy Eating, and A Salad for All Seasons. Her latest book, Carneval: A celebration of meat in recipes, was published by Transworld Publishers on 8 September 2016.

Having once been a vegetarian, Harry then spent 15 years researching meat in all its aspects. Her passion for butchery and all meat matters even took her to Smithfield Market where she moonlit as an apprentice butcher in her early twenties. She now bases her cooking style to paying homage to the origins of meat as well as being aware of the environmental implications of eating it.

Harry's most recent TV series have included Fox's Baking Good, Baking Bad and Sinful Sweets, which aired on Cooking Channel USA. She is also a frequent judge on Donut Showdown and Sugar Showdown.

Bibliography

References

1980s births
British emigrants to the United States
British television chefs
Date of birth missing (living people)
Food Network chefs
Living people
Place of birth missing (living people)
Women chefs
Women cookbook writers